Mary Eaton (January 29, 1901 – October 10, 1948) was an American stage actress, singer, and dancer in the 1910s and 1920s, probably best known today from her appearance in the first Marx Brothers film, The Cocoanuts (1929). A professional performer since childhood, she enjoyed success in stage productions such as the Ziegfeld Follies. She appeared in another early sound film, Glorifying the American Girl (1929). Her career declined sharply during the 1930s.

Biography

Early life and career
Eaton, a native of Norfolk, Virginia, began attending dance lessons in Washington, DC, along with her sisters Doris and Pearl, at the age of seven. In 1911, all three sisters were hired for a production of Maurice Maeterlinck's fantasy play The Blue Bird at the Shubert Belasco Theatre in Washington, D.C. While Eaton had a minor role in the show, it marked the beginning of her career in professional theatre.

After The Blue Bird ended, in 1912, the three Eaton sisters and their younger brother Joe began appearing in various plays and melodramas for the Poli stock company. They quickly gained reputations as professional, reliable, and versatile actors, and were rarely out of work. A 1914 newspaper article described Mary Eaton as "the newest and littlest member of the company", adding that she had "admirable poise and grace."

In 1915, all three sisters appeared in a new production of The Blue Bird for Poli; Doris and Mary were given the starring roles of Mytyl and Tytyl. The siblings then were invited to reprise their roles for a New York and road tour of the play, produced by the Shubert Brothers. When the show closed, on the recommendation of the Shuberts, Mary began studying ballet in earnest with Theodore Kosloff.

Professional theatre

Of all of the Eatons, Mary was perhaps the most famous and the most popular. An exceptionally talented dancer, she earned raves in a production of Intime in Washington, DC in 1917.

In 1916, she made her Broadway debut, dancing a ballet specialty in Follow Me. The next year, she performed in the Shubert Brothers' Over the Top with Fred and Adele Astaire. Throughout the 1920s, Eaton was a constant presence on Broadway, appearing in eight different productions.

She was featured in three editions of the Ziegfeld Follies, those of 1920, 1921, and 1922. Eaton's trademark dance routine, which she performed in the Follies, involved a complicated sequence of pirouettes around the stage en pointe.

Film career
Eaton also had a brief film career, appearing in two important early sound movies that were filmed at Paramount's New York studios in Astoria, Queens. She was the ingenue in The Cocoanuts (1929), the first film featuring 
the Marx Brothers and Glorifying the American Girl (1929), which included a brief Technicolor sequence, was produced by Flo Ziegfeld and included a cast of stage notables. Eaton's singing and dancing routines, including her signature pirouette sequence, were featured. The film's commercial failure, however, signaled the end of Eaton's starring career in sound movies. Her speaking voice on film was a carefully affected, high-pitched twitter that enunciated dialogue carefully, probably a remnant of her stage training. Her actual speaking voice, without the affectation and in a lower, more realistic range, can be heard briefly in Glorifying the American Girl.

Personal life
Many of the Eaton siblings, including Mary, found their careers waning in the early 1930s. She made her final stage appearance in 1932. Beset by career woes and three consecutive difficult marriages, Eaton struggled with alcoholism. Although her siblings tried to intervene on numerous occasions, and she entered rehabilitation programs several times, she was unable to overcome her alcohol addiction.

Eaton married Millard Webb (her director of Glorifying the American Girl) in the summer of 1929. At the time of her death she was married to actor Eddie Laughton.

Eaton died at age 47 in Hollywood, California of a heart attack. She was buried in Forest Lawn Cemetery in Los Angeles alongside other members of the Eaton family.

Filmography

See also

 Charles Eaton
 Doris Eaton Travis
 Pearl Eaton
 The Seven Little Eatons
 Ziegfeld Follies

References

 Travis, Doris Eaton. The Days We Danced, Marquand Books, 2003,

External links

 
 
 

Vaudeville performers
American stage actresses
American film actresses
American silent film actresses
Musicians from Norfolk, Virginia
Ziegfeld girls
1901 births
1948 deaths
20th-century American actresses
Burials at Forest Lawn Memorial Park (Glendale)
Actors from Norfolk, Virginia
Eaton family